Ralph Lewis Spotts (June 14, 1875 – April 17, 1924) was an American sport shooter who competed in the 1912 Summer Olympics.

Life and career
He was born in Canton, Ohio on June 14, 1875. In 1912, he won the gold medal as member of the American team in the team clay pigeons competition. In the individual trap event he finished ninth. He died on April 17, 1924 in New York City.

References

External links
Olympic profile

1875 births
1924 deaths
American male sport shooters
Shooters at the 1912 Summer Olympics
Olympic gold medalists for the United States in shooting
Trap and double trap shooters
Olympic medalists in shooting
Medalists at the 1912 Summer Olympics